Tuscumbia is a city in and the county seat of Colbert County, Alabama, United States. As of the 2010 census, the population was 8,423. The city is part of The Shoals metropolitan area.

Tuscumbia was the hometown of Helen Keller, who lived at Ivy Green. Several sites in the city are listed on the National Register of Historic Places, especially in the Tuscumbia Historic District. The city is also the site of the Alabama Music Hall of Fame.

History
When the Michael Dixon family arrived about 1816, they were the first European Americans to settle here. It was traditional territory of the Chickasaw people. The settlers traded with Chief Tucumseh for the Tuscumbia Valley and built their home at the head of the big spring. Other settlers joined them and there developed a village known as the Big Spring Community. The men of the community requested that the state legislature incorporate them as a city. The town was incorporated in 1820 as Ococoposa, a Chickasaw word meaning 'dry watermelon'. It is one of Alabama's oldest towns. In 1821, its name was changed to Big Spring and on December 22, 1822, to Tuscumbia, after the Chief Rainmaker of the Chickasaw.

Although shoals on the nearby Tennessee River made the river nearly impassable, a federal road completed in 1820 provided the area with good access to markets. Tuscumbia soon became the center for agriculture in northern Alabama. A line to the town on the Tuscumbia, Courtland and Decatur Railroad was completed in 1832, and by 1850 Tuscumbia was a major railroad hub for train traffic throughout the South.

From 1826 to the 1860s, the Tuscumbia Female Academy operated in Tuscumbia. It was one of a number of private schools founded by planters and others wealthy enough to pay for the education of their sons and daughters. There were no public schools until 

During the Civil War, the railroad hub made Tuscumbia a target of the Union Army, which destroyed the railroad shops and other parts of the town. The Civil War resulted in the permanent closure of the Tuscumbia Female Academy.

Tuscumbia was designated as the county seat for Colbert County in 1867.

A tornado, estimated at F4 intensity on the Fujita scale, struck Tuscumbia on November 22, 1874, damaging or destroying about a third of the town and killing 14 people.

In April 1894, three African Americans accused of planning to commit arson were taken from the Tuscumbia jail by a mob of 200 men and lynched, hanged from the bridge over the Tennessee River. The turn of the century period was the nadir of race relations in the South, with frequent violence by whites against African Americans to maintain white supremacy.

21st century
The 2019–20 coronavirus pandemic resulted in the temporary closure of two tourist destinations: The Alabama Music Hall of Fame and Ivy Green at the beginning of the month of April 2020 to reduce social contact and help curb the spread of COVID-19.

Geography
Tuscumbia is located northeast of the center of Colbert County at  (34.730839, -87.702854). It is bordered to the north by the city of Sheffield and to the northeast by the city of Muscle Shoals.

Climate
According to the Köppen climate classification, Tuscumbia has a humid subtropical climate (abbreviated Cfa).

Demographics

2020 census

As of the 2020 United States census, there were 9,054 people, 3,304 households, and 2,207 families residing in the city.

2010 census
As of the census of 2010, there were 8,423 people, 3,704 households, and 2,279 families residing in the city. The racial makeup of the city was 75.91% White, 21.16% Black or African American, 0.39% Native American, 0.33% Asian, 0.48% from other races, and 1.70% from two or more races. 1.37% of the population were Hispanic or Latino of any race.

There were 3,704 households, out of which 25.4% had children under the age of 18 living with them, 46.2% were married couples living together, 14.0% had a female householder with no husband present, and 36.6% were non-families.  34.5% of all households were made up of individuals, and 17.5% had someone living alone who was 65 years of age or older.  The average household size was 2.19 and the average family size was 2.81.

In the city, the population was spread out, with 21.64% under the age of 18, 6.20% from 18 to 24, 30.15% from 25 to 44, 19.50% from 45 to 64, and 21.9% who were 65 years of age or older.  The median age was 42 years. For every 100 females, there were 83.6 males.  For every 100 females age 18 and over, there were 78.6 males.

The median income for a household in the city was $28,793, and the median income for a family was $39,831.  Males had a median income of $32,159 versus $18,860 for females.  The per capita income for the city was $18,302.  About 11.1% of families and 15.1% of the population were below the poverty line, including 21.7% of those under age 18 and 19.92% of those age 65 or over.

Education
Tuscumbia City Schools and the Colbert County Board of Education provide public education for Tuscumbia. The following public schools are located in Tuscumbia:
Deshler Area Vocational Center (grades 9 through 12)
Deshler High School (grades 9 through 12)
Colbert Heights High School (grades 7 through 12)
Deshler Middle School (grades 6 through 8)
Colbert Heights Elementary School (grades K through 6)
New Bethel Elementary (grades K through 6)
R. E. Thompson Intermediate School (grades 3 through 5)
G. W. Trenholm Primary School (grades K through 2)

Private schools in Tuscumbia include Covenant Christian School (grades K through 12).

Media
Radio stations:
WVNA 1590 AM (News/Talk)
WZZA 1410 AM (Urban contemporary)

Major highways
 U.S. Highway 43
 U.S. Highway 72

Notable people 
Cynthia Bailey, model, actress, entrepreneur, and cast member of The Real Housewives of Atlanta
Beverly Barton, novelist
Deion Belue, American football cornerback
Archibald Hill Carmichael, politician and U.S. Representative from 1933 to 1937
Mike Cooley, guitarist for the alt-country/rock band Drive-By Truckers
James Deshler, Confederate brigadier general during the American Civil War
Al Gamble, session musician
Howell Thomas Heflin, U.S. senator from Alabama (1979–97), Alabama Supreme Court Chief Justice (1971–77)
Richard H. Jackson, former four-star admiral in the United States Navy
Helen Keller, deafblind author, activist, lecturer, and socialist
Robert B. Lindsay, 22nd Governor of Alabama
Frank Manush, former Major League Baseball third baseman for the Philadelphia Athletics
Heinie Manush, professional baseball player, elected to the Baseball Hall of Fame
Jimmy Orr, former National Football League wide receiver
Margaret Pellegrini, played one of the Munchkins in the movie The Wizard of Oz
Billy Pettinger, songwriter, painter and author
Will Reynolds, mass murderer
William Henry Sawtelle, United States federal judge from 1931 to 1934
William H. Steele, member of the United States District Court for the Southern District of Alabama
Larry Stutts, State Senator whose patient's death inspired "Rose's Law"
Wilson D. Watson, United States Marine Corps private who received the Medal of Honor for his actions on Iwo Jima during World War II

References

External links 

 
 Virtual Tour of Tuscumbia
 American Memory's Built in America Collection which has drawings, photographs, and descriptions of old homes and buildings in Tuscumbia
 Tuscumbia City Schools

Cities in Alabama
Cities in Colbert County, Alabama
Florence–Muscle Shoals metropolitan area
County seats in Alabama
Populated places established in 1820
1820 establishments in Alabama
Alabama populated places on the Tennessee River
Alabama placenames of Native American origin